Maianthemum paludicola is a perennial flowering plant. It is a rare terrestrial herb, endemic to Costa Rica. It has only been found in high-elevation bogs and wetlands and was first described in 1986.

Description
Flower- and leaf-bearing stems grow off an unusual woody, aerial rhizome that is stiff, upright and linear or forked. It sits mostly out of the ground and is made up of lower parts of older shoots. Stems are upright, slightly flexuous, hairless and leafy.

Leaves
Leaves have a short, 1-2 mm long petiole. Leaf blades are hairless, egg- to lance-shaped with pointed tips and rounded bases with flat (not undulating) edges. The venation pattern is distinctive, with veins that are uniform and not strongly evident.

Flowering clusters
40 to 80 (up to 120) flowers are set on a pyramid-shaped, branched flowering stalk (panicle). The main axis of the panicle is 6-20 cm long, stiff and upright. It is slightly ribbed, hairless and red-violet. About 5 to 15 spreading to ascending side branches are set at 3-10 mm intervals along the main axis of the panicle. The side branches are 3-8 cm long with 1 or 2 flowers at the base and others set at intervals of 1.6-6 mm along the branch. Flowers are set on pedicels that are 2-5 mm long, ribbed and hairless.

Flowers and fruits  
The flowers have white, spreading tepals 3--4 mm long. Stamens are inserted at the tepal base. Fruits are rounded, 5-7 mm across, ripening to red. Flowering is from April to November but fruits are retained throughout the year.

Distribution
This is a species endemic to Costa Rica, documented in the provinces of San José and Cartago.

Habitat and ecology
Found from 2350 m to 3077 m elevation in open, boggy sites, including along powerlines.

References

paludicola
Flora of Costa Rica